Rémy Taranto (born 3 February 1982) is a French adaptive rower who competes in international elite competitions in the mixed coxed four. He is a World bronze medalist and a European silver medalist, he has competed at the 2012 and 2016 Summer Paralympics but did not medal. He has qualified for the 2020 Summer Paralympics, winning a bronze medal in the rowing competition.

References

External links

1982 births
Living people
Sportspeople from Marseille
French male rowers
Paralympic rowers of France
Rowers at the 2012 Summer Paralympics
Rowers at the 2016 Summer Paralympics
Rowers at the 2020 Summer Paralympics
Medalists at the 2020 Summer Paralympics
World Rowing Championships medalists for France
Paralympic bronze medalists for France
21st-century French people